All Night Session! Vol. 1 is an album by pianist Hampton Hawes from a session recorded the night of November 12, 1956 at Contemporary's Studios in Los Angeles and released on Contemporary Records.

Reception

In his review for AllMusic review states Arwulf Grenier wrote, "This studio session contained many elements associated with a live gig: the work took place during regular nightclub performing hours, the improvisations were mostly extended, and there were no alternate takes. A remarkable freshness and spontaneity prevailed throughout the session".

Track listing

Personnel
Hampton Hawes – piano
Jim Hall – guitar
Red Mitchell – bass 
Eldridge Freeman – drums

References

Contemporary Records albums
Hampton Hawes albums
1958 albums